North Korea competed as North Korea at the 1964 Winter Olympics in Innsbruck, Austria.  It was the first time that the nation was represented at any Olympic Games. Han Pil-hwa is the first Winter Olympic medalist from either Korea before South Korea won its first winter medals in 1992 starting with Kim Ki-hoon.

Medalists

Cross-country skiing

Men

Women

Speed skating

Men

Women

References
Official Olympic Reports
International Olympic Committee results database
 Olympic Winter Games 1964, full results by sports-reference.com

Korea, North
1964
1964 in North Korea